Alain Bozon (born 6 September 1939) is a French former professional ice hockey player and curler.

Bozon captained the French national team in the 1960s and was inducted into the French Ice Hockey Hall of Fame in 2012.

Bozon also curled, he competed for France at the 1966 Scotch Cup, the World Men's Curling Championship, and at the 1970 World Men's Curling Championship. At the national level, he competed from Club de curling Mont d'Arbois (Megève).

Curling teams

Personal life
Bozon's son, Philippe, played professional ice hockey in the National Hockey League (NHL) for the St. Louis Blues and his grandchild Tim was drafted by the Montreal Canadiens in the 2012 NHL Entry Draft.

References

External links

1939 births
Living people
French ice hockey forwards
French male curlers